is a Japanese manga storywriter, novelist and screenwriter. Under the name Yuma Ando, he received the 2003 Kodansha Manga Award for shōnen for writing Kunimitsu no Matsuri. The pen name "Tadashi Agi" (亜樹 直) is shared with his sister . He graduated from Tokyo Metropolitan Musashi Senior High School and Waseda University School of Economics & Political Science.

Pen names
Besides the main pen-name of "Tadashi Agi", Shin Kibayashi also goes by other pen names:
Seimaru Amagi (天樹征丸 Amagi Seimaru)
Yuma Ando (安童夕馬 Andō Yūma)
Yuya Aoki (青樹佑夜 Aoki Yūya)
Jōji Arimori (有森丈時 Arimori Jōji)
Hiroaki Igano (伊賀大晃 Igano Hiroaki)
Ryō Ryūmon (龍門諒 Ryūmon Ryō)
S.K

Works

As Seimaru Amagi 
  (1992–present, Kodansha), original idea; English translation: Kindaichi Case Files (2004–2008, Tokyopop)
  (2001–2005, Kodansha)
  (2002–2004, Kodansha); English translation: Remote (2004–2006, Tokyopop)
  (2014–2017, DeNA)
  (2016–ongoing, Shogakukan)

As Tadashi Agi 
  (1994–1995, Kodansha)
  (1995–2003, Kodansha)
  (2004, Kodansha)
  (2004–2014, Kodansha); English translation: The Drops of God (2011–2012, Vertical)
  (2014–2015, Kodansha)
  (2015–ongoing, Kodansha)

As Yuma Ando 
  (1996–2000, Kodansha)
  (2001–2005, Kodansha)
  (Shogakukan) (2003–2005, Kodansha)
  (2006–2009, Kodansha)
  (2011–hiatus, Kodansha)
  (2011–2013, Kodansha); English translation: Sherlock Bones (2013–2014, Kodansha USA)
  (2014–ongoing, Kodansha)
  (2014–2016, DeNA)

As Yuya Aoki 
  (1999–2007 Kodansha); English translation: GetBackers (2004–2008, Tokyopop)
  (2003 Kodansha); English translation: Psycho Busters (2008–2009, Del Rey Manga)
  (2010–ongoing, Kodansha)

As Jōji Arimori 
  (2000–2001, Kodansha)
  (2001–2002, Kodansha)

As Hiroaki Igano 
  (2006–2017, Kodansha)
  (2021-On going, Kodansha)

As Ryō Ryūmon 
  (2007–2009, Kodansha)

As Shin Kibayashi 
  (2009, Kodansha)
  (2017–ongoing, Kodansha)

Other media
The main characters of Magazine Mystery Reportage were based on then editors of Weekly Shonen Magazine, including Kibayashi who acts as the leader of the team investigating various conspiracies.

On January 14, 2015, it was announced through Nintendo that Kibayashi was writing the story for the fourteenth Fire Emblem game, entitled Fire Emblem Fates.

On August 31, 2021, Netflix announced that they are working with Shin Kibayashi on an original anime series titled Lady Napoleon.

References

External links
 "Kami no Shizuku" author's wine diary
 Seimaru Amagi Diary
 

1962 births
Japanese mystery writers
Living people
Manga artists from Tokyo
Manga writers
 
Waseda University alumni
Winner of Kodansha Manga Award (Shōnen)
Writers from Tokyo